Savelyev, also spelled as Savelev, Saveliev, or Saveljev, or Savelyeva (feminine; Савельева), is a Russian surname that is derived from the male given name Savely and literally means Savely's. Notable people with the surname include:

 Aleksei Vitalyevich Savelyev (born 1977), Russian footballer who played for FC Torpedo Moscow and PFC CSKA Moscow
 Andrei Saveliyev (born 1962), Russian politician and a former member of the Russian State Duma
 Boris Savelev, (born 1948), Russian photographer
 Dmitry Savelyev (disambiguation), several people
 Gennadi Saveliev, American Ballet Theatre soloist
 Ilya Savelev (born 1971), Russian volleyball  player
 Larissa Saveliev (born 1969), Russian ballet dancer
 Ludmila Savelyeva (born 1942), Russian  film actress and ballerina
 Sergey Savelyev (skier) (1948–2005), Russian cross country skier
 Sergey Savelyev (speed skater) (born 1972), Russian speed skater
 Sergey Vyacheslavovich Savelyev (born 1959), Russian  scientist, evolutionist, paleoneurologist, author of the idea of cerebral sorting
 Viktor Savelyev (1928–2013), Russian surgeon
 Viktor Zakharevich Savelyev (1875–1943), Russian military officer
 Vitaly Savelyev (born 1954), Russian businessman

Russian-language surnames